Buncombe County Courthouse is a historic courthouse building located at Asheville, Buncombe County, North Carolina.  It was designed by architect Frank Pierce Milburn and built between 1924 and 1928. It is a 17-story, steel frame skyscraper sheathed in brick and ashlar veneer.  It features complex setbacks and an extravagant overlay of Neo-Classical Revival ornament.

It was listed on the National Register of Historic Places in 1979. It is located in the Downtown Asheville Historic District.

References

External links

County courthouses in North Carolina
Courthouses on the National Register of Historic Places in North Carolina
Neoclassical architecture in North Carolina
Government buildings completed in 1928
Buildings and structures in Asheville, North Carolina
National Register of Historic Places in Buncombe County, North Carolina
1928 establishments in North Carolina
Historic district contributing properties in North Carolina
Skyscrapers in Asheville, North Carolina
Skyscraper office buildings in North Carolina